Aess or AESS may refer to:

 Samir Aess or Ayass (born 1990), Bulgarian football player
 IEEE Aerospace and Electronic Systems Society
 Association of English Singers & Speakers, where Patricia Routledge was past president.